Iain Steel (born 3 May 1971) is a Malaysian professional golfer.

Career
Steel was born in Sabah, Malaysia to a Scottish father and Malaysian mother. He went to Auburn University in the United States and turned professional in 1996. That year, he became the first Malaysian golfer ever to play in The Open Championship.

Steel played on the second tier Nike Tour, now the Web.com Tour, in 1997, before moving up to the elite PGA Tour for 1998 after graduating from the Qualifying Tournament. His rookie season on the PGA tour brought little success and he returned to the Nike Tour for 1999. He made few cuts in three more seasons on that tour before he lost his playing rights for 2002. He returned in 2003 after a season on the Canadian Tour but continued to struggle, before trying to qualify for the European Tour at the end of 2004. He reached the final stage of qualifying school to earn a limited card for Europe's second tier Challenge Tour for 2005. Although he had two top ten finishes, he made little impact and was unable to retain his card.

Steel joined the Asian Tour in 2006 after finishing tied for 4th place at the tour qualifying school. He has since managed to establish himself on the tour, appearing inside the top 50 on the Order of Merit each season with a number of strong finishes, although he has yet to win a tournament. While he plays predominantly in Asia, he has retained membership of the European Tour, so is also shown on that tour's money list courtesy of his appearances in tournaments co-sanctioned by both tours.

Steel played on the Asian Tour until a back injury cost him his Tour card in 2011 and he limped through 2012 making one cut in nine events. He was part of the Asian Development Tour for 2013, won twice, placed third on the ADT Order of Merit, and regained his Asian Tour card.

Professional wins (6)

Nike Tour wins (1)

Canadian Tour wins (1)

Asian Development Tour wins (2)

1Co-sanctioned by the Taiwan PGA Tour
2Co-sanctioned by the Professional Golf of Malaysia Tour

Other wins (2)
2001 Alabama Open
2006 Malaysian PGA Championship

Playoff record
European Tour playoff record (0–1)

Asian Tour playoff record (0–1)

Results in major championships

Note: Steel only played in The Open Championship.
CUT = missed the half-way cut

See also
1997 PGA Tour Qualifying School graduates

References

External links

Malaysian male golfers
Auburn Tigers men's golfers
Asian Tour golfers
PGA Tour golfers
European Tour golfers
People educated at Strathallan School
Malaysian people of Scottish descent
People from Sabah
1971 births
Living people